The Astarpa River (possibly the modern Meander River, Turkey) is a river in western Anatolia mentioned in Hittites records of the 14th century BC.

The annals of Mursili II record that in the 3rd year of his reign, which would be 7 years prior to Mursili's eclipse in 1312 BC, prince Piyama-Kurunta of Arzawa stood against his army at Walma by the river Astarpa. Mursili defeated him at the river. Mursili chased Piyama-Kurunta into Apasa. The following winter, Mursili withdrew to the Astarpa to prepare for the next season.

A treaty between Mursili and Kupanta-Kurunta of Mira later lists the Astarpa as the border of Kupanta-Kurunta's client region of Kuwaliya (Mira).

The annals of Mursili during the Astarpa campaign mention nearby regions of "Apasa", "Millawanda", and "Ahhiyawa". It is thought that these are the Bronze Age names of Ephesus, Miletus, and Mycenaean Greece. Astarpa is most likely the Meander River. This means that Mira is probably to the north of Astarpa, and that its neighbouring Seha River Land would be to the north of Mira.

Rivers of Turkey
Arzawa